Anubis Dance is the fifth studio album by Nekropolis, released independently in 2003.

Track listing

Personnel 
Adapted from the Anubis Dance liner notes.
 Peter Frohmader – instruments, cover art
 Pit Holzapfel – trombone (4)
 Holger Röder – drums (8, 9)

Release history

References 

2003 albums
Nekropolis albums